Odense Boldklub is a Danish association football club based in Odense, Denmark. The club was formed in 1887 as a cricket club.

Key 

Superliga = Danish Superliga
Division 1 = Danish 1st Division
Division 2 = Danish 2nd Division
P = Games played
W = Games won
D = Games drawn
L = Games lost
F = Goals for
A = Goals against
Pts = Points
Pos = Final position

ITC3 = Third Intertoto Cup Round
QR2 = Second Qualifying Round
QR3 = Third Qualifying Round
PO = Play-off
GS = Group stage
R1 = Round 1
R2 = Round 2
R3 = Round 3
R4 = Round 4
QF = Quarter-finals
SF = Semi-finals

Seasons 

Correct as of the end of the 2018–19 season.

References 

Odense Boldklub
Danish football club seasons